Jacques Doniol-Valcroze (15 March 1920 – 6 October 1989) was a French actor, critic, screenwriter, and director. In 1951, Doniol-Valcroze was a co-founder of the renowned film magazine Cahiers du cinéma, along with André Bazin and Joseph-Marie Lo Duca. The magazine was initially edited by Doniol-Valcroze between 1951-1957. As critic, he championed numerous filmmakers including Orson Welles, Howard Hawks, and Nicholas Ray.
In 1955, then 23-year-old François Truffaut made a short film in Doniol-Valcroze's apartment, Une Visite. Jacques's daughter Florence played a minor part in it.

In 1955, he was a member of the jury at the 16th Venice International Film Festival, and in 1964 a member of the jury at the 14th Berlin International Film Festival.

New Wave
In his thirties he played a pivotal role in the French New Wave, discussing the beginnings of "the new cinema" as the co-founder of Cahiers du cinéma and defended Alain Robbe-Grillet.

In 1963 he appeared in L'Immortelle, an international co-produced drama art film directed by Alain Robbe-Grillet.

His own works in this area include directing the film L'eau a la bouche and acting in some New Wave films, including Chantal Akerman's cult classic Jeanne Dielman, 23 quai du Commerce, 1080 Bruxelles. Additionally he was friends with François Truffaut who shot his first film Une Visite in his apartment. He was married to Françoise Brion.

The Director’s Fortnight, founded in 1968 during the nationwide strikes which closed down the Cannes Film Festival that year, was the brainchild of Jacques Doniol-Valcroze. The event was sponsored by his fledgling Société des Réalisateurs de Films (Film Directors Society) with the intention of "...opening up the Cannes Festival to little-known filmmakers and national cinemas, without concern for budgets or shooting formats."

He died of a ruptured aneurysm in 1989.

Actor

Director
Movies
 1957: L'Œil du maître (short film)
 1958: Les Surmenés (short film)
 1958: Bonjour, Monsieur La Bruyère (short film)
 1959: L'Eau à la bouche (A Game for Six Lovers
 1960: Le Cœur battant (The French Game (film))
 1961: La Dénonciation
 1962: P.X.O. (short film) with Pierre Kast
 1965: Jean-Luc Godard (short film)
 1967: Le Viol (The Immoral Moment)
 1970: La Maison des Bories (The House of the Bories)
 1971: L'Homme au cerveau greffé
 1977: Une femme fatale

TV films and series
 1964: L'Enlèvement d'Antoine Bigut (film)
 1967: La Bien-aimée (film)
 1979: Le Tourbillon des jours (TV series, 6 episodes, 52 min.)
 1981: Les Fiancées de l'Empire (TV series, 6 episodes)
 1982: Lorelei (film)
 1982: Venise en hiver (film)
 1984: Un seul être vous manque (TV series, 8 episodes, 52 min.)
 1988: Nick, chasseur de têtes (film)
 1989: Nick, chasseur de têtes (TV series)
1989: La Vie en couleurs (film)

Novels
 Les portes du baptistère, 1955, Editions Denoël
 Les fiancées de l'Empire, vol. 1: Les hauteurs de Wagram, 1980, Editions JC Lattès
 Les fiancées de l'Empire, vol. 2: La route d'Espagne, 1981, Editions JC Lattès

References

1920 births
1989 deaths
French male film actors
French film critics
Male actors from Paris
20th-century French male actors
French male non-fiction writers
20th-century French male writers
Cahiers du Cinéma editors